Thomas Knauer (born 2 February 1964) is a retired German football defender.

References

External links
 

1964 births
Living people
German footballers
VfL Bochum players
SC Preußen Münster players
2. Bundesliga players
Association football defenders